The 2022 Acrobatic Gymnastics World Championships was held from 10 to 13 March 2022 in Baku, Azerbaijan.

Medal table

Details:

Medal summary

Combined

Balance

Dynamic

Participating issue
Because of Russian invasion of Ukraine, Russia and Belarus were banned, and Ukrainian athletes could not attend due to the war in their country. 9 of the 18 medals (50%) from the previous period (2020 Acrobatic Gymnastics World Championships) went to these three countries.

References

Acrobatic Gymnastics World Championships
Acrobatic Gymnastics World Championships
Acrobatic Gymnastics World Championships
Acrobatic Gymnastics World Championships
Acrobatic Gymnastics World Championships